Ian Pendlebury (born 3 September 1983) is an English former footballer who played as a defender for Wigan Athletic, Leigh RMI and Hyde United.

Pendlebury made his debut for Wigan in 2001, making four league appearances for the club before being released in March 2003.

Honours

Club
Leigh RMI
Lancashire FA Challenge Trophy (1): 2002−03

References

External links
 

Living people
Footballers from Bolton
English footballers
Association football defenders
Wigan Athletic F.C. players
English Football League players
Leigh Genesis F.C. players
Hyde United F.C. players
1983 births